Chris Anthony DeFrance (born September 13, 1956) is a former American football wide receiver in the National Football League for the Washington Redskins. He also was a member of the Saskatchewan Roughriders of the Canadian Football League. He played college football at Arizona State University.

Early years
DeFrance attended Corcoran High School. He moved on to Bakersfield College, where he was a Junior College All-American at wide receiver and helped his team reach the 1976 Junior Rose Bowl. In track, he practiced the long jump and triple jump, winning the conference championship in both events. He also ran the mile-relay.

In 1977, he transferred to Arizona State University, posting 11 receptions for 291 yards and 3 touchdowns. In the Fiesta Bowl against Penn State University, he came up big with 7 receptions for 144 yards.

In 1978, although he missed spring practice with a broken foot, he came back to lead the team with 31 receptions for 617 yards and 5 touchdowns. In the Garden State Bowl, he had a 58-yard touchdown reception.

Professional career

Dallas Cowboys
DeFrance was selected by the Dallas Cowboys in the sixth round (164th overall) of the 1979 NFL Draft. He was waived on August 21.

Washington Redskins
On August 29, 1979, he was claimed off waivers by the Washington Redskins. He was cut on October 9.

Chicago Bears
On February 6, 1980, he was signed as a free agent by the Chicago Bears. He was released on August 19.

Saskatchewan Roughriders
On March 19, 1981, he was signed by the Saskatchewan Roughriders of the Canadian Football League. In his first year he posted 64 receptions for	1,195 yards, an 18.7-yard average and 5 touchdowns, including a 100-yard touchdown reception. He had 3 straight 1,000+ receiving yards seasons and was a two-time CFL West All-Star. In 1984, he missed the 1,000 yards plateau (917 yards) because of injuries.

In 1986, he was traded to the Montreal Alouettes in exchange for linebacker John Pointer. He was cut during training camp.

DeFrance finished his career with 328 receptions for 5,035 yards and 21 touchdowns.

References

1956 births
Living people
People from Corcoran, California
Players of American football from California
American players of Canadian football
American football wide receivers
Canadian football wide receivers
Bakersfield Renegades football players
Arizona State Sun Devils football players
Washington Redskins players
Saskatchewan Roughriders players
Montreal Alouettes